James Hamilton, 5th Duke of Hamilton and 2nd Duke of Brandon KT FRS (5 January 1703 – 2 March 1743) was a Scottish peer, the son of the 4th Duke of Hamilton.

Hamilton attended Winchester College from 1716 to 1717. He matriculated at Christ Church, Oxford on 2 May 1718 and was created a DCL on 6 June 1719. He succeeded to his father's title of Duke of Hamilton in 1712 following his death in the notorious Hamilton–Mohun Duel in Hyde Park. At the foundation of the noted charity, the Foundling Hospital in London, Hamilton was one of the charity's first governors and his name is listed on the organisation's royal charter, granted in October 1739.

Marriages and issue
Hamilton married three times. On 14 February 1723 (St. Valentine's Day), he married Lady Anne Cochrane, daughter of the 4th Earl of Dundonald and granddaughter of Charles Murray, 1st Earl of Dunmore. They had one child:
James (1724–1758), later 6th Duke of Hamilton. 

Anne died in childbirth. Hamilton next married Elizabeth Strangways (an aunt of the Countess of Ilchester), but she died childless on 3 November 1729. On 21 August 1737, Hamilton married married for the third time, and the bride was Anne Spencer (an aunt of the Countess of Galloway). They had three children together:

Lady Anne Hamilton (1738 – 11 November 1780), who married Arthur Chichester, 1st Marquess of Donegall. They had three sons.
Archibald Hamilton, 9th Duke of Hamilton (15 July 1740 – 16 February 1819)
Lord Spencer Hamilton (1742 – 20 March 1791)

Hamilton died in 1743, aged 40 at Bath from jaundice and palsy. His widow Elizabeth married Richard Savage Nassau and had three more children.

References

1703 births
1743 deaths
18th-century British people
Knights of the Thistle
Fellows of the Royal Society
105
102
James Hamilton, 5th Duke of Hamilton
Members of the Royal Company of Archers
Alumni of Christ Church, Oxford
James